Hamilton Frazier Moore, Jr. (born April 4, 1951), known as Frazier Moore, is an American journalist. For a quarter-century he was a television reporter/critic for The Associated Press, retiring from that job in December 2017. He is the author of Inside ‘Family Guy’: An Illustrated History, published in 2019 by HarperCollins.

Background
Moore grew up in Athens, Georgia, and attended the University of Georgia, graduating in 1974 with a journalism degree.  He was a staff writer for The Atlanta Journal-Constitution and The Fort Myers (Florida) News-Press, where he received a National Headliners Award.  Other publications for which Moore has written include Spy, Connoisseur, The New York Times, Interview and TV Guide.

First job out of college: Serving as world's worst well-intentioned management trainee at Southern Bell telephone, which swiftly disconnected him.

In apparent incongruency with his ultimate career as a TV critic—or maybe not—in a fit of pique he once hurled his TV down a flight of stairs.

He was also Director of Publications for the Atlanta Symphony Orchestra.

Career with Associated Press

In 1992, Moore became television critic for The Associated Press, based in New York. One of his columns recounted his performance as an extra on Law & Order.  Another suggested longtime 60 Minutes commentator Andy Rooney retire, whereupon Rooney aired Moore's telephone number and 60 Minutes viewers swamped the AP headquarters with calls.

Moore served as a Peabody Awards Board member from 2004–2010. He has hosted a weekly TV-related commentary for Los Angeles public radio station KCRW.

In December 2017, Moore retired from the AP, but not to retire—instead, to pursue the Family Guy project and other ventures.

References 

1951 births
Living people
American television critics
University of Georgia alumni
Associated Press people
People from Atlanta